Nogent-sur-Seine is a commune in the Aube department in north-central France. The headquarters of The Soufflet Group is located here, as is the Musée Camille Claudel. The large Nogent Nuclear Power Plant is located here.

Population

Personalities
Sculptor Camille Claudel lived in Nogent-sur-Seine with her family from 1876 to 1879.

Frédéric Moreau, the hero of Gustave Flaubert's novel Sentimental Education, is a native of Nogent-sur-Seine.

The abbey of Nogent-sur-Seine was destroyed during the French Revolution. Fragments of it were used in 1817 in making the canopy over the graves of Pierre Abélard and Héloïse d'Argenteuil at the Père Lachaise Cemetery.

International relations
Nogent-sur-Seine is twinned with:
 Rielasingen-Worblingen, Baden-Württemberg, Germany - since 1973
 Joal-Fadiouth, Senegal - 1987

See also
 Communes of the Aube department
 List of medieval bridges in France
 Paul Dubois (sculptor)

References

External links

 Official town website 
 Dubois-Boucher Museum in Nogent-sur-Seine  This link is not currently active
 Félix Charpentier. Sculpture in musée Paul Dubois-Alfred Boucher

Subprefectures in France
Communes of Aube
Champagne (province)
Aube communes articles needing translation from French Wikipedia